The Jingbirok: A Memoir of Imjin War is a South Korean historical drama television series. Labeled as "Special Project Epic Drama for 70th Anniversary of Korean Independence Day", it aired on KBS1 every Saturday and Sunday at 21:40 (KST) from February 14 to August 2, 2015.

Synopsis 
Based on the memoir "Jingbirok" , written in 1604 by Joseon scholar Ryu Seong-ryong (1542–1607), who served as prime minister of the Joseon Kingdom (1392-1910) during the seven-year Imjin War (1592–1598). "Jingbirok" (Book of Corrections) is the name of Ryu's memoir, which looks back on the Japanese invasion under the leadership of Toyotomi Hideyoshi. The memoir covers Ryu Seong-ryong's experiences from 1592 to 1598 during the Japanese invasion of Joseon era Korea. The story takes place in Korea and Japan between the Japanese invasion and the Battle of Noryang where admiral Yi Sun Sin was killed.

Cast 
 Kim Sang-joong - Ryu Seong-ryong
 Kim Tae-woo - King Seonjo, the fourteenth king of the Joseon Dynasty 
 Noh Young-hak - Prince Gwanghae, the future fifteenth king of the Joseon Dynasty 
 Kim Seok-hoon - Yi Sun-sin
 Kim Kyu-cheol - Toyotomi Hideyoshi
 Lee Kwang-ki - Konishi Yukinaga
 Lee Jung-yong - Kato Kiyomasa
 Jo Jae-wan - So Yoshitoshi
 Jang Tae-sung - Emperor Wanli of Ming, the 14th Emperor of the Ming Dynasty
 Hwang In-young - Queen Uiin, King Seonjo's first wife and first queen consort
 Oh Ji-young - Nene, Toyotomi Hideyoshi's main wife
 Son Seung-Woo - Yodo, Toyotomi Hideyoshi's concubine and second wife
 Seo Yoon-ah - Noble Consort Zheng/Jung Gwi-Bi (Korean name), Emperor Wanli's beloved concubine
 Bae Do-hwan - Chen Lin, a Chinese Ming dynasty general and navy admiral

Awards and nominations

Notes

References

External links 
 
 
 

Korean-language television shows
South Korean historical television series
Television series set in the Joseon dynasty
2015 South Korean television series debuts
2015 South Korean television series endings
Korean Broadcasting System television dramas
Television shows set in North Gyeongsang Province
Television series by KBS Media
Japanese invasions of Korea (1592–1598) in fiction
Television series set in the Ming dynasty